Boyner Büyük Mağazacılık A.Ş. (operating as Boyner) is a Turkish retail company, selling mainly textile products. In 2013, it had 78 Boyner and 61 YKM (Yeni Karamürsel) stores in 37 provinces of Turkey and employed around 5,200 people.

Deran Taşkıran became general manager of Boyner in May 2014, replacing Aslı Karadeniz, another female executive.

As of February 2019, Eren Çamurdan is the new CEO of Boyner Buyuk Magazacilik A.S.

References

Retail companies of Turkey